Akumadan Senior High School is a second-cycle institution in Akumadan in the Ashanti Region of Ghana.

History
The school was established in 1976 which is 46 years now. It is located at Akumadan in the Offinso North District of Ashanti Region and can be found on the left side of the road when coming from Kumasi to Techiman. The traditional colour of the school is sea blue.

See also

 Education in Ghana
 List of senior high schools in the Ashanti Region

References

Educational institutions established in 1976
1976 establishments in Ghana
Ashanti Region
High schools in Ghana
Public schools in Ghana